Six Gun Gold is a 1941 Western film directed by David Howard and starring Tim Holt.

Plot
Don, Smokey and Whopper stop a runaway stagecoach and save passenger Jenny Blanchard on their way to Placerville, where the marshal is Don's brother, Brad.

When he gets to town, Don finds someone impersonating his brother. The law counters by accusing Don and his pals of being horse thieves. Jenny vouches for their integrity with father Ben and sister Penny.

It turns out the stagecoach line owner's assistant is behind a gold-shipment theft and other crimes. Don and local miners get involved, saving the day.

Cast

Reception
The film made a profit of $22,000. It was also critically well received.

References

External links 
 
 
 
 

1941 films
1941 Western (genre) films
American Western (genre) films
RKO Pictures films
Films directed by David Howard
Films produced by Bert Gilroy
American black-and-white films
Films scored by Paul Sawtell
1940s American films